William Frederick McNaughton (8 December 1905 – 1980) was an English footballer who played as a centre forward.

McNaughton played league football between 1928 and 1936 for Northampton Town, Gateshead and Stockport County. He was also on the books of Millwall in 1925. McNaughton also played non-league football for Barking Town, Peterborough & Fletton United, Walker Celtic and City of Durham.

Sources

1905 births
1980 deaths
English footballers
Association football forwards
Barking F.C. players
Millwall F.C. players
Peterborough & Fletton United F.C. players
Northampton Town F.C. players
Gateshead F.C. players
Hull City A.F.C. players
Stockport County F.C. players
Walker Celtic F.C. players
Durham City A.F.C. players
English Football League players